In jazz and jazz harmony, the chord progression from iv7 to VII7 to I (the tonic or "home" chord) has been nicknamed the backdoor progression or the backdoor ii-V, as described by jazz theorist and author Jerry Coker.  This name derives from an assumption that the normal progression to the tonic, the ii-V-I turnaround (ii-V7 to I, see also authentic cadence) is, by inference, the "front door", a metaphor suggesting that this is the main route to the tonic.

The VII7 chord, a pivot chord borrowed from the parallel minor of the current tonic major key, is a dominant seventh. Therefore, it can resolve to I; it is commonly preceded by IV going to iv, then VII7, then I. In C major the dominant would be G7: (the notes GBDF), sharing two common tones with B7: (the notes BDFA). The notes A and F serve as upper leading-tones back to G and E (when the chord moves to the tonic, C major), respectively, rather than B and F serving as the lower and upper leading-tones to C and E in a conventional G7-C major (V7-I) cadence.

Alternative usage

The term "Backdoor" has been used by author Shelton Berg to refer to another entirely unrelated progression. The unexpected modulation created through the substitution of the highly similar Imaj9 for iii7 (in C: CEGBD and EGBD) at the end of the ii7-V7 turnaround to a tonicized iii (ii7/iii=iv7, V7/iii=VII7, iii), arrives at 'home' (the temporary tonic of iii) through unexpected means, the 'back door' instead of the 'front door'(iii7, the individual notes EGBD, being entirely contained within Imaj9, the individual  notes of the C major chord, CEGBD, and the seventh of the dominant seventh chord still resolving downward). The resolution of a dominant seventh chord up a step (in this case a half-step, also called a semitone) is called a deceptive cadence.

See also
VII-V7 cadence

References

Cadences
Chord progressions
Chord substitution
Jazz terminology